Action is a Dutch-French international discount store-chain. Owned by different owners like 3i and eurofund V. It sells low budget, non-food and some food products with long shelf lives. Action operates stores in ten countries — Netherlands, Belgium, Germany, France, Austria, Luxembourg, Poland, Czech Republic, Italy and since 2022 in Spain and Slovakia. As of 2022, Action is operating more than 2,000 stores and employing more than 68,000 employees. In 2013, Action had a revenue of just over a billion euros, which was a 14% rise compared to 2012 when they had a revenue of 873 million euros.

History 
Action was founded by Gerard Deen and Rob Wagemaker, who were later joined by Boris Deen. They opened their first store in 1993 in Enkhuizen and started expanding by founding new stores that same year. In 2002, they had 94 stores; in 2005, the first store was opened in Belgium, in Rijkevorsel; and, in 2009, they opened their first store in Germany. In 2012, the company had 300 stores and opened its first store in France. In 2014, Action opened its 500th store. It continued growing exponentially. In 2021, there are more than 1,800 stores across Europe.

References

External links 
 

Companies based in North Holland
Dutch companies established in 1993
Retail companies established in 1993
Discount stores
3i Group companies